Sir James Bain of Crofthead (1817–1898) was a Scottish iron-founder who served as Lord Provost of Glasgow from 1874 to 1877. Bain Street in Glasgow is named after him.

Life

He was born in Glasgow on 22 January 1817 the son of Robert Bain (died 1838).

He was general manager of William Baird & Co, coal and ironmasters.

His house at 3 Park Terrace just east of Kelvingrove Park was designed in 1855 by Charles Wilson and famously had a room lined in real gold. Visitors to this wonder included Ulysses Grant.

He became a town councillor in 1863 and was elected Lord Provost in 1874 and knighted by Queen Victoria in 1877 when he was replaced as Lord Provost by William Collins the famous Scottish publisher..

He was Deputy Chairman of the Clyde Navigation Trust and together with Sir James Lumsden organised the building of the Prince's Dock on the River Clyde.

He was MP for Whitehaven 1891/2 and founded the Whitehaven Ironworks there.

Bain died on 25 April 1898. He is buried with his family in the churchyard of Glasgow Cathedral.

Bain's gold room was restored 1992 to 1995.

Artistic Recognition

He was portrayed in office by Sir Daniel Macnee.

Family
He was married to Mary Dove. Their children included John Dove Bain (died 1843) and James Robert Bain.

References

1817 births
1898 deaths
Lord Provosts of Glasgow
Politicians from Glasgow
UK MPs 1886–1892
Scottish politicians
19th-century British businesspeople
Businesspeople from Glasgow
Conservative Party (UK) MPs for English constituencies